John Coxe may refer to:

Naukane (c. 1779–1850), Native Hawaiian chief who traveled widely through North America in the early 19th century
John Redman Coxe (1773–1864), physician and professor of medicine at the University of Pennsylvania
John Coxe (MP) (c. 1695–1783), English landowner and Member of Parliament

See also
John Cox (disambiguation)